The Very Best of The Doobie Brothers is a two-disc greatest hits album by The Doobie Brothers released on March 13, 2007.

Reception 
Stephen Thomas Erlewine from AllMusic gave the album 4.5/5 stars, writing:

Track listing

References

2007 greatest hits albums
The Doobie Brothers compilation albums
Warner Records compilation albums
Festival Records compilation albums